The Corsicans (Corsican, Italian and Ligurian: Corsi; French: Corses) are a Romance ethnic group. They are native to Corsica, a Mediterranean island and a territorial collectivity of France.

Origin

The island was populated since the Mesolithic (Dame de Bonifacio) and the Neolithic by people who came from the Italian peninsula, especially the modern regions of Tuscany and Liguria. An important megalithic tradition developed locally since the 4th millennium BC. Reached, like Sardinia, by Polada culture influences in the Early Bronze Age, in the 2nd millennium BC Corsica, the southern part in particular, saw the rise of the Torrean civilization, strongly linked to the Nuragic civilization.

The modern Corsicans are named after an ancient people known by the Romans as Corsi. The Corsi, who gave their name to the island, actually originated from the Northeastern part of Nuragic Sardinia (Gallura). According to Ptolemy, the Corsi were formed by a composite number of tribes that dwelt in Corsica (namely the Belatones or Belatoni, the Cervini, the Cilebenses or Cilibensi, the Cumanenses or Cumanesi, the Licinini, the Macrini, the Opini, the Subasani, the Sumbri, the Tarabeni, the Titiani and the Venacini) as well as in the far north-east of Sardinia (the Lestricones, Lestrigones or Lestriconi / Lestrigoni, the Longonenses or Longonensi). These Corsi shared the island with the Tibulati, who dwelt at the extreme north of Sardinia near the ancient town of Tibula.

Further research is still needed to answer the question of the origin of the Corsi and their alleged relation with today's Corsicans. According to several scholars, they may have been a group of tribes affiliated to the ancient Ligures, like the Ilvates in the neighboring Ilva island (today's Elba in Italy), and may have spoken the old Ligurian language. Corsica was later colonized by Etruscans from what is modern Tuscany, with some brief, localized colonies of Greeks and Carthaginians, until being taken over by the Romans.

In subsequent centuries, Corsica was ruled and settled by Pisans (from 1050 to 1295) and the Genoese (from 1295 to 1755, when the island broke free from La Superba): this is reflected in the fact that around 80% of the modern Corsican surnames (Casanova, Luciani, Agostini, Colonna, Paoli, Bartoli, Rossi, Albertini, Filippi, Cesari, etc.) is found in Italy, as well as in the fact that the modern Corsican varieties, especially the Northern ones, are linguistically considered part of Tuscan. Because the island has been historically and culturally related to the Italian mainland up until then, the Italian populations from Northern and Central Italy have contributed to a significant degree to the modern Corsican ancestry.

Population in Corsica

Corsica has a population of 322,120 inhabitants (Jan. 2013 estimate).
At the 2011 census, 56.3% of the inhabitants of Corsica were born on the island and 28.6% in Continental France, while 0.3% were natives of Overseas France and 14.8% hailed from foreign (non-French) countries.

The majority of the foreign population in Corsica comes from the Maghreb (particularly Moroccans, who made up 33.5% of all immigrants in Corsica at the 2011 census), and from Southern Europe (particularly Portuguese, 22.7% of all immigrants, followed by the Italians, 13.7%).

The Corsican diaspora
During the 19th century and the first part of the 20th century, Corsican emigration was significant. Large numbers of Corsicans left the island for the French mainland or foreign countries. During the 19th century, the favorite destinations of migrants were the French colonies and South America (for more details, see Corsican immigration to Puerto Rico and Corsican immigration to Venezuela). 

Then, between the 1920s and the 1950s, the major destination became the French mainland, primarily Marseille, which today is considered as the "first Corsican city of the world" with around 100,000 Corsicana in the city. Causes of this emigration are various; poverty is the main reason (the French laws for restriction of exportations, the Second Industrial Revolution and the agricultural crisis had an adverse effect on the local economy). Later, the departures have become more considerable owing to the demographic strain caused by First World War.

Immigration

Notes: Essentially Pieds-Noirs who resettled in Corsica after the independence of Tunisia, Morocco and Algeria, many of whom had Corsican ancestry.2
An immigrant is by French definition a person born in a foreign country and who didn't have French citizenship at birth. Note that an immigrant may have acquired French citizenship since moving to France, but is still listed as an immigrant in French statistics. On the other hand, persons born in France with foreign citizenship (the children of immigrants) are not listed as immigrants.
3 Morocco, Tunisia, Algeria
4 Portugal, Italy, Spain, Andorra, Gibraltar, Monaco
Source: INSEE

Culture

Languages

Alongside French (Français), the official language throughout France, Corsican (Corsu) is the other most widely spoken language on the island: it is a Romance language pertaining to the Italo-Dalmatian branch and akin to medieval Tuscan. Corsican was long the vernacular language besides Italian (Italiano), which retained official status in Corsica until 1859. Since then, Italian as the island's traditional prestige language has been replaced by French due to the annexation of the island by France in 1768. Over the next two centuries, the use of French grew to the extent that, by the Liberation in 1945, all islanders had a working knowledge of French. The twentieth century saw a wholesale language shift, with islanders changing their language practices to the extent that there were no monolingual Corsican speakers left by the 1960s. By 1990, an estimated 50% of islanders had some degree of proficiency in Corsican, and a small minority, perhaps 10%, used Corsican as a first language. Fewer and fewer people speak also a Ligurian dialect in what has long been a language island, Bonifacio: it is locally known by the name of bunifazzin.

Gallurese dialect is a variety of Corsican spoken in the extreme north of Sardinia, including the region of Gallura and the archipelago of La Maddalena. In the Maddalena archipelago, the local dialect (called Isulanu, Maddaleninu, Maddalenino) was brought by shepherds from Alta Rocca and Sartène in southern Corsica during immigration in the 17th to 18th centuries. Though influenced by Gallurese, it has maintained the original characteristics of Corsican. There are also numerous words of Genoese and Ponzese origin.

Number of Corsican speakers 
The January 2007 estimated population of the island was 281,000, while the figure for the March 1999 census, when most of the studies – though not the linguistic survey work referenced in this article – were performed, was about 261,000 (see under Corsica). Only a fraction of the population at either time spoke Corsican with any fluency. The 2001 population of 341,000 speakers on the island given by Ethnologue exceeds either census and thus may be considered questionable, like its estimate of 402,000 speakers worldwide.

The use of Corsican over French has been declining. In 1980 about 70% of the population "had some command of the Corsican language." In 1990 out of a total population of about 254,000 the percentage had declined to 50%, with only 10% using it as a first language. The language appeared to be in serious decline when the French government reversed its non-supportive stand and began some strong measures to save it. Whether these measures will succeed remains to be seen. No recent statistics on Corsican are available.

UNESCO classifies the Corsican language as a potentially endangered language, as it has "a large number of children speakers" but is "without an official or prestigious status." The classification does not state that the language is currently endangered, only that it is potentially so. Often acting according to the current long-standing sentiment unknown Corsicans cross out French roadway signs and paint in the Corsican names. The Corsican language is a key vehicle for Corsican culture, which is notably rich in proverbs and in polyphonic song.

Cuisine

From the mountains to the plains and sea, many ingredients play a role. Game such as wild boar (Cignale, Singhjari) is popular, and in old times mouflon (muvra) were consumed. There also is seafood and river fish such as trout. Delicatessen such as figatellu, coppa, ham (prizuttu), lonzu are made from Corsican pork (porcu nustrale). Cheeses like Brocciu, casgiu merzu (the Corsican version of the Sardinian casu marzu), casgiu veghju are made from goat or sheep milk. Chestnuts are the main ingredient in the making of pulenta. A variety of alcoholic drinks also exist, ranging from aquavita (brandy), red and white Corsican wines (Vinu Corsu), muscat (plain or sparkling), and the famous "cap corse" produced by Mattei.

Genetics
Genetic research has revealed that the Corsican samples presented affinities with people from the French region of Provence and the Italians from Tuscany, Liguria, Campania, Sicily and Latium; other genetic studies pointed to a regional differentiation along a North-South axis, mirroring the island's geographic and linguistic features. In 2019, analysis of the genome of the Corsican population also reveals a close genetic affinity with the populations of northern and central Italy, while sharing with the Sardinians a notable proportion of ancestry, demographic processes and similar isolations. It is also verified that the Corsicans would have ancient Basques origins, Greek, Germanic, Levantine Arabs, Celtic origins but these origins are found in a minority in front of the common origins with the Sardinians and the Italians of the North. The analysis revealed that the Corsican population shares several genomic characteristics with Sardinia and north-central Italy, creating a unique blend of genomic ancestry. Overall, the Corsican samples have been found to be genetically closer to the Northern and Central Italian populations than to the neighboring Sardinians. The same study estimate that the  genome of the modern Corsicans derive from Anatolia Neolithic: 33%, Europe Middle Neolithic/Chalcolithic: 34%, Steppe EMBA: 19% and Iran Neolithic: 14%.

Notable Corsicans

Bonaparte Family

Fictional people from Corsica
 Mireille Bouquet, the daughter of a mafia family in the 2001 anime series Noir.

See also
Italians in France
Corsica
History of Corsica
Etruscan civilization
List of Nuragic tribes
Republic of Pisa
Republic of Genoa
Corsican language
Sassarese
Gallurese
Sardinian people
Italian people
French people
Corsican immigration to Puerto Rico
Corsican immigration to Venezuela
Italian irredentism in Corsica

References

Smith, William (1872). Dictionary of Greek and Roman Geography. London: J. Murray. pp. pages 689–692. Downloadable Google Books.

External links
Strabo's text of Geographica - Geography (Strabo)
Ptolemy's text of Geographica - Geography (Ptolemy)

 
 
Romance peoples